Robert K. "Bob" Sweeney (born May 29, 1949) is a retired New York Assemblyman first elected in 1988 to represent the 11th district, which includes Lindenhurst, Copiague, Amityville, Wyandanch, and West Babylon. He is a Democrat.

Sweeney is a lifetime resident of the district he represents and attended public schools in Lindenhurst. He earned a bachelor's degree from Adelphi University and a Master of Public Administration from the C.W. Post Campus of Long Island University. He served as the Lindenhurst Village Clerk from 1973 to 1988.

Sweeney was elected to the New York State Assembly in a March 1988 special election. He replaced Patrick G. Halpin, who was elected Suffolk County Executive in November 1987. He retired in 2014 and was succeeded by Kimberly Jean Pierre.

References

External links
New York State Assembly Member Website

1949 births
Living people
People from Babylon, New York
Democratic Party members of the New York State Assembly
Adelphi University alumni
LIU Post alumni
People from Lindenhurst, New York
21st-century American politicians